The Newcastle Star is a free weekly newspaper in Newcastle, New South Wales, Australia. It is owned by Newcastle Newspapers, the publisher of the Newcastle Herald. The paper is delivered to 114,000 homes each week.

External links
  Newcastle Star online

Newspapers published in New South Wales
Weekly newspapers published in Australia
Publications with year of establishment missing